Hiram Hubbard House, also known as Noadiah Hubbard House or Hubbard House, is a historic home located in Champion, Jefferson County, New York.  It was built in 1820, and is a -story, three bay, Federal style limestone dwelling.  It has a side hall plan, rear kitchen wing, full basement, and side gable roof.   It features an elliptical fanlight over the front door.  The house was acquire by the 4 River Valleys Historical Society on November 15, 2005.

It was added to the National Register of Historic Places in 2012.

References

External links
4 River Valleys Historical Society website

Houses on the National Register of Historic Places in New York (state)
Federal architecture in New York (state)
Houses completed in 1820
Houses in Jefferson County, New York
1820 establishments in New York (state)
National Register of Historic Places in Jefferson County, New York